Nash Edgerton (born 19 January 1973) is an Australian film director, actor and stuntman, and a principal member of the movie-making collective Blue-Tongue Films.

Early life 
Edgerton was born in Blacktown, New South Wales and grew up in Dural (both suburbs of Sydney). He is the son of Marianne (van Dort), a homemaker, and Michael Edgerton, a solicitor/property developer. His younger brother is actor Joel Edgerton. His mother is a Dutch immigrant who was born in The Hague.

Film career

Stuntman 
As a stuntman, he has worked on such films as The Matrix trilogy, The Thin Red Line, Superman Returns, and, most notably, Star Wars: Episode II – Attack of the Clones and Star Wars: Episode III – Revenge of the Sith, as the stunt double for Ewan McGregor, who played Obi-Wan Kenobi. His brother Joel appeared in those same films as young Owen Lars.

Director 
Throughout Edgerton's career, he has made critically well-received short films often starring himself, such as Spider and Bear. He has also directed a total of four music videos for artist Bob Dylan ("Beyond Here Lies Nothin'", "Must Be Santa", "Duquesne Whistle", and "The Night We Called It a Day"). His feature-length directorial debut was The Square (2008), an Australian neo-noir thriller. His most recent film as director was Gringo, released in 2018.

From 2018 to 2021, Edgerton directed every episode of Mr Inbetween, an Australian television black comedy-drama series starring and written by Scott Ryan. The series is adapted from Ryan's 2005 film The Magician, which Edgerton helped Ryan expand from a short film. Edgerton's stepdaughter Chika Yasumura appears in the series as the daughter of Ryan's character.

Personal life 
He began dating Carla Ruffino in 2011 and they married on 1 April 2014. He is stepfather to her daughter Chika Yasumura from a previous marriage. They have one daughter together, Zumi (born 11 August 2015).

Filmography

Film
 Loaded (1996) - as Richard - Short co-directed by Kieran Darcy-Smith
 Deadline (1997) - as Young filmmaker - Short
 Bloodlock (1998) - as Ian -  Short co-directed by Kieran Darcy-Smith
 Two Hands (1999 film) Australian Film - Stunts
 The Matrix (1999) - as  Resistance Member - Stunt double, uncredited
 The Pitch (2001) - Short
 Moulin Rouge! (2001) - as Stagehand - Stunt team, uncredited
 Star Wars: Episode II – Attack of the Clones (2002) - Stunts
 Fuel (2003) - Short
  The Matrix Reloaded (2003) - as Security Guard #5
 The Matrix Revolutions (2003) - Stunts
 Lucky (2005) - Short
 The IF Thing (2005) - Short
 Star Wars: Episode III – Revenge of the Sith (2005) -Stunts
 Macbeth (2006) - as Macdonwald - Stunts
 Superman Returns (2006) - Stunts
 Spider (2007) - Short
 The Square (2008) - Director
 Hesher (2010) - Stunt coordinator
 Knight and Day (2010) - Stunts
 Bear (2011) - Short
 I Am Number Four (2011) as Mog - Stunts
 Zero Dark Thirty (2012) as Nate - DEVGRU EOD - Stunt double
 The Great Gatsby (2013) - Stunt double / stunt performer
 The Bling Ring (2013) -  Stunt coordinator
 The Wolverine (2013) - Stunt
 Felony (2013) - Stunt coordinator / stunt double
 The Rover (2014) - as Town Soldier
 Son of a Gun (2014) - as Chris
 The Equalizer (2014) - as Teddy's Guy - Stunts, uncredited
 Jane Got a Gun (2015) - as Fur Trader - Stunts
 The Gift (2015) - as Frank Dale - Stunts
 Straight Outta Compton (2015) - Stunts
 American Ultra (2015) - as Beedle - Stunts
 Sinister 2 (2015) - Stunts
 Miles Ahead (2015) - Stunt double
 The Nice Guys (2016) -Stunts, uncredited
 The Darkness (2016) - Stunt coordinator
 American Pastoral (2016) -  Stunt coordinator
 20th Century Women (2016) - Stunt coordinator
 Please Stand By (2017) - Stunt coordinator
 Bright (2017) - Stunts
 Bleeding Steel (2017) - Stunts
 American Express (2017)
 Boy Erased (2018) - Stunt coordinator
 Gringo (2018) - Director
 Little Monsters (2019) - Stunts
 Once Upon a Time in Hollywood (2019) - Stunt performer / stunts
 Babyteeth (2019) - Stunt coordinator
 All the Bright Places (2020) - Stunt coordinator
 The Invisible Man (2020) - as Security Guard

Television
 Love Child (2016) - Stunts, 1 episodes
 Mr Inbetween (2018) - as Trent - 1 episodes, director

Music video
 Crossfire (2010)
 Strong by London Grammer

Awards and nominations

ARIA Music Awards
The ARIA Music Awards is an annual awards ceremony that recognises excellence, innovation, and achievement across all genres of Australian music. They commenced in 1987. 

! 
|-
| 2002
| Nash Edgerton for Eskimo Joe's "Liar"
|rowspan="2" | Best Video
| 
|rowspan="2" |  
|-
| 2004
| Nash Edgerton for The Sleepy Jackson's "Good Dancers"
| 
|-

References

External links
 

1973 births
20th-century Australian male actors
21st-century Australian male actors
Australian film directors
Australian stunt performers
Living people
People educated at The Hills Grammar School
Male actors from New South Wales
People from Blacktown, New South Wales